This is a list of notable events relating to the environment in 1927. They relate to environmental law, conservation, environmentalism and environmental issues.

Events
The Indian Forest Act, 1927 is passed.
The last known specimen of the Syrian wild ass was shot.
The last of the European bison in the Western Caucasus were shot.

September
The last confirmed sighting of the Australian paradise parrot was made and it is now considered to be extinct.

See also

Human impact on the environment
List of environmental issues